Juscelino Kubitschek was the President of Brazil between 1956 and 1961. Many places were named after him, including:

Populated places 
 Presidente Juscelino, a municipality in Minas Gerais, Brazil
 Presidente Kubitschek, a municipality in Minas Gerais, Brazil
 Presidente Juscelino, Maranhão, a municipality in Maranhão, Brazil
 Serra Caiada, known until 2012 as Presidente Juscelino, a municipality in Rio Grande do Norte, Brazil
 , a neighbourhood of Coronel Fabriciano, Minas Gerais, Brazil, named after , the President's mother
 Juscelino Kubitschek, Santa Maria, a neighbourhood in Santa Maria, Rio Grande do Sul, Brazil

Transport 
 Presidente Juscelino Kubitschek International Airport, Brasília, Federal District, Brazil
 Juscelino Kubitschek Airport, Diamantina, Minas Gerais, Brazil
 Juscelino Kubitschek bridge, Brasília, Federal District, Brazil
 , a street in Brasília, Federal District, Brazil
  (built 1960), between Estreito, Maranhão and Aguiarnópolis, Tocantins
 BR-040, named President Juscelino Kubitschek Highway in 2009, a federal highway of Brazil connecting Brasília to Rio de Janeiro
 , arterial road in the city of São Paulo, Brazil
 , major thoroughfare in Palmas, Tocatins, Brazil

Buildings 
 Kubitschek Plaza, 5-star hotel, Brasília, Federal District, Brazil
 Conjunto Governador Kubitschek, the tallest building in Belo Horizonte, Minas Gerais, Brazil
 Juscelino Kubitschek Power Plant, at the Irapé Dam in Mina Gerais, Brazil

Museums 
 JK Memorial, mausoleum and museum in Brasília, Federal District, Brazil
 Kubitschek Residence Museum (est. 2013) in Belo Horizonte, Minas Gerais, Brazil

Stadiums 
  a.k.a. , Federal District, Brazil
 Estádio JK a.k.a. , Itumbiara, Goiás, Brazil
 , Andradas, Minas Gerais, Brazil
 Estádio Juscelino Kubitschek de Oliveira (1923-1986), former stadium in Belo Horizonte, Minas Gerais, Brazil
 Juscelino Kubitschek Arena, indoor stadium in Belo Horizonte, Minas Gerais, Brazil
  (est. 1976) in Manhuaçu, Minas Gerais, Brazil

Educational institutions 
  (est. 1957), the first primary school established in Brasília, Federal District, Brazil, named after teacher , the President's mother
  (est. 1957) in Rio de Janeiro, Brazil, named after First Lady Sarah Kubitschek
  a.k.a.  (est. 1979), a state technical college in Rio de Janeiro, Brazil

Hospitals 
  (1957-1974), a former hospital in Brasília, Federal District, Brazil
  a.k.a. Rede Sarah (est. 1960), a network of hospitals in Brazil, named after First Lady Sarah Kubitschek

Parks 
 , urban park in Brasília, Federal District, Brazil, named after First Lady Sarah Kubitschek
 , urban park in Belo Horizonte, Minas Gerais, Brazil

See also
Kubitschek (disambiguation)